Singapore competed in the 2010 Commonwealth Games held in Delhi, India, from 3 to 14 October 2010. Singapore competed in 8 out of 17 sports consisting of 68 athletes and 34 officials, making it the largest-ever contingent sent to the Commonwealth Games. Athletes are representing the country in Aquatics, Archery, Athletics, Badminton, Gymnastics, Shooting, Table tennis and Weightlifting. With 11 gold medals won, this is Singapore's best ever Commonwealth Games performance. Table tennis player Feng Tian Wei was the flag-bearer for the opening ceremony.

Medalists

| align="left" valign="top"|

| style="text-align:left; vertical-align:top;"|

Team Singapore at the 2010 Commonwealth Games

Key
 Qualifiers / Medal Winners
 Top 8 Finish (Non Medal Winners)
 Non-Qualifiers / Non Top 8 Finish

Aquatics

Swimming 

Singapore's Swimmers got disqualified in a controversial incident. That occurred after their head coach failed to submit in the entry lists in time. Singapore Swimming Teams Head coach Ang Peng Siong apologized to his team and media after failing to register them on time, that resulted in their disqualification.

Athletes List

Archery 

Vanessa Loh Tze Rong, Wendy Tan Liu Jie & Elizabeth Cheok Khang
Leng competed in women's Recurve Team.

Athletics

Mohd Elif Mustapap, Muhd Amirudin Jamal, Lee Cheng Wei, Gary Yeo Foo Er, Calvin Kang Li Loong & U K Shyam all competed in Men's 4 × 100 m Relay, and the Men's 100m Individual. Adam Kamis competed in the parasport's 100m T4G.

Badminton
The Men's Team consisted of Derek Wong Zi Liang, Ashton Chen Yong Zhao, Hendri Kurniawan Saputra, Hendra Wijaya & Chayut Triyachart.
The Women's team consisted of Xing Aiying, Fu Mingtian, Yao Lei, Shinta Mulia Sari & Vanessa Neo Yuyan.

Gymnastics 
This was the first Commonwealth Games at which Singapore's gymnasts gained medals.

Women's Artistic Gymnastics consisted of Krystal Khoo Oon Hui, Lim Heem Wei, Nicole Tay Xi Hui & Tabitha Tay Jia Hui.

Men's Artistic Gymnastic team consists of Jonathan David Chan, Thuang Tong & Gabriel Gan Zi Jie.

Shooting

Table tennis
The able tennis team was highly successful at these games.

The men's team consisted of Gao Ning, Yang Zi, Cai Xiaoli, Pang Xue Jie & Ma Liang.

The women's team consisted of Feng Tianwei, Wang Yuegu, Li Jiawei, Sun Beibei & Yu Mengyu.

Weightlifting

Helena Wong Kar Mun was the sole competitor in the weightlifting for Singapore.

Goh Rui Si Theresa also competed in the Powerlifting (Parasports).

Team officials
Coaches

Sports Medicine Team

See also
 2010 Commonwealth Games
 Singapore at the 2010 Summer Youth Olympics

References

Nations at the 2010 Commonwealth Games
Singapore at the Commonwealth Games
2010 in Singaporean sport